The Cardom is an Israeli 81 mm/120 mm Recoil Mortar System (RMS), manufactured by Soltam Systems. It is used by the US Army, the Israel Defence Forces, NATO countries, and others. The Cardom is an autonomous, computerized system for mounting on light and medium armored carriers. The system provides accurate and effective fire support.

Overview
The system uses a new Computerized Integrated Navigation and Self Positioning and Aiming systems. Its modern Target Acquisition Devices together with a specially designed Recoiling Mortar System, attenuates the firing loads and enables mounting the systems on wheeled and tracked AFV's, or even soft-skinned vehicles such as trucks. The CARDOM Aiming mechanisms are linked to state-of-the-art command, control and communication systems, to achieve quick response automatic laying mode. The IDF delivered Cardom system takes target acquisition data, that provides range, bearing, position and other data from an observation point and transmits it directly to the Cardom system. Using electrical servo motors the mortar barrel is then set at the exact traverse and elevation angles ready for firing.

The 120 mm Cardom has a burst rate of 16 rpm, followed by a 4 rpm sustained rate of fire. The Cardom Recoil Mortar System has been qualified for fielding with the 3rd US Army Stryker brigade, and will be coupled to the US Army's M95 Mortar Fire Control System on the M1129 Mortar Carrier. So far over 320 mortar systems have been manufactured for the U.S. Army.

Performance

Range: 7,000-8,000 meters
Calibre: 120/81mm smoothbore and rifled
Max rate of fire : 16 rounds per minute
Traverse (deg) : 360
Shoot of first round: less than 30 sec
Crew : 2-4 dependent on carrier
Dual mode : mounted and dismounted

Operators

 Azerbaijani Land Forces

 Cameroon Army

 Royal Danish Army (also known as M/10 or Cardom 10)

 Israeli Army

 Armed Forces of the Republic of Kazakhstan

 Portuguese Army

 Philippine Army

 Spanish Army

 Royal Thai Army

 Uganda Army

 United States Army

 Zambian Army

See also
M1129 Mortar Carrier
AMOS
Patria NEMO
Soltam 120mm mortar system
Soltam 155mm mobile Howitzer
Light-weight Combat Vehicle (LCV) System

References

Further reading

External links

Cardom mortar system on defense-update.com

Video
 youtube video of Cardom system

Infantry mortars
120mm mortars
Military equipment introduced in the 2000s